The following units and commanders fought in the First Battle of Bull Run on the Union side. The Confederate order of battle is shown separately. Order of battle compiled from the army organization during the battle and the reports.

Abbreviations used

Military rank
 BG = Brigadier General
 Col = Colonel
 Ltc = Lieutenant Colonel
 Maj = Major
 Cpt = Captain
 Lt = Lieutenant

Other
 w = wounded
 mw = mortally wounded
 k = killed
 c = captured

Army of Northeastern Virginia

BG Irvin McDowell, Commanding

General Staff:
 Chief of Artillery: Maj William F. Barry
 Chief Engineer: Maj John G. Barnard
 Chief Quartermaster: Cpt Otis H. Tillinghast (mw)

Notes

References
 Manassas National Battlefield Park - The Battle of First Manassas.
 The Manassas Campaign, Virginia, July 21, 1861.
 Robert Underwood Johnson, Clarence Clough Buell, Battles and Leaders of the Civil War: The Opening Battles, Volume 1 (Pdf), New York: The Century Co., 1887.

 U.S. War Department, The War of the Rebellion: a Compilation of the Official Records of the Union and Confederate Armies, U.S. Government Printing Office, 1880–1901.

American Civil War orders of battle